NFL London may refer to:

 A potential London NFL franchise
 NFL London Games, played as part of the NFL International Series